Michigan: Report from Hell is a survival horror game developed by Grasshopper Manufacture and published by Spike. It was released in Japan on August 5, 2004, in Europe on September 29, 2005, and in Australia in 2005. This game was never released in North America. Directed by Akira Ueda and planned by Goichi Suda, the game focuses on a news crew for the fictional ZaKa TV, dedicated to covering strange phenomena. The game is unique in the sense that it is played almost entirely though the viewfinder of a camera; the player loses if they run out of film before solving the mysteries in a mission.

Plot
In Michigan, players take the role of a rookie cameraman for ZaKa TV, the entertainment division of the powerful ZaKa conglomerate. Accompanied by Brisco, an outspoken sound engineer, and Pamela, a reporter, the player is sent to investigate a mysterious mist that has descended over the city of Chicago. The player quickly discovers that the mist is somehow transforming people into fleshy, leech-like monsters with human limbs. Pamela is attacked by the creatures, and is later found in the process of transforming into one. The player, Brisco, and a new female reporter are sent to investigate the source of the monster outbreak.

It is eventually revealed that the cause of the monsters is a mutative virus developed by a scientist, Dr. O'Conner, intended to be used as a biological weapon against the enemies of the United States. The virus was developed with the complicity of the U.S. military, the U.S. government, and ZaKa.

After unsuccessfully attempting to retrieve a vaccine for the virus, the crew attempts to evacuate the city by heading to an airport on the outskirts of the city where a military evacuation transport is supposed to arrive. At the airport, the crew encounters a strange young man who appears to be intellectually disabled. He somewhat disjointedly reveals that he was Dr. O'Conner's original guinea pig, and begins to run around and yell in a bizarre manner. After the player commands the reporter to shoot the strange man, he transforms into a massive pile of mutated flesh before exploding messily. With the man's death, the mist clears, and Brisco theorizes he was the cause of both the mist and the monster outbreak.

In the game's epilogue, the crew approaches a nearby lighthouse, which the military has ordered them to activate so that the transport plane can locate them and pick them up. While the tired reporter waits outside, Brisco and the cameraman ascend the lighthouse and activate the light at the top. Suddenly, Brisco begins to mutate; the cameraman flees, and the Brisco creature laughs maniacally before escaping through a window.

The game ends with a final film clip of the cameraman, whose appearance is determined by the player's actions, speaking in front of his camera. In three of the endings, the cameraman attempts to reveal the identity of the people behind the virus, but is killed by an unseen assassin before he gives a name. If the player has obtained a high enough amount of "Immoral" points, the cameraman claims responsibility for the outbreak.

Characters
 The Cameraman: The player character, a rookie cameraman for ZaKa TV. He is a silent protagonist, who does not speak or appear during the course of the game, until the game's conclusion. His appearance differs depending on the ending the player receives. In the "Immoral" ending, the cameraman is named Andy Steamboat (voiced by Chris Koprowski), and in the "Erotic" ending, he is named Teddie Snooker (voiced by Jack Merluzzi). His name is not given in the "Suspense" and "High Immoral" endings, although the credits purport that his name is Dwight Murdoch (voiced by Robert Tsonos) in the former and Diego Morales (voiced by Jack Merluzzi) in the latter.
 Jean-Phillppe Brisco  (voiced by Greg Irwin): The outspoken and excitable sound engineer/boom operator, Brisco will accompany the player throughout the entire game. Unlike the reporters, he cannot be killed during normal gameplay.
 Ann Anderson, Carly Reis, Justine Rhoades, Paula Orton, and Mark Bockwinkle (voiced by Lynn Harris, Terry Osada, Peggy Woo, Rumiko Varnes, and Chris Koprowski): Five reporters for ZaKa TV. If one of them dies, the next in line will replace them as the player's reporter in the next level.
 Pamela Martel (voiced by Bianca Allen): The player's reporter in the game's tutorial level and ZaKa TV's star reporter.
 Nina Valkov (voiced by Rachel Walzer): A young woman who serves as the player's reporter in a mandatory level regardless of the fate of previous levels' reporters. Not actually a ZaKa TV reporter, she is in a relationship with an employee.
 Debora Flair (voiced by Bianca Allen): The cold and mysterious chief of ZaKa TV. She sends several ZaKa TV crews to cover the monster outbreak without warning them of the dangers involved. Brisco believes that she is partially responsible for the monster outbreak, but whether or not this is true is never established during the game.

Gameplay
Michigan is played from a first-person perspective, as viewed through the recording lens of a television news camera. Players take the role of the cameraman in a news crew, and are accompanied by a reporter and a sound engineer–boom operator as they explore the game's locations.

The main method of interacting with the environment in Michigan is to "tag" objects. This draws the attention of the reporter to them, causing her to interact with the object. In combat, players can "tag" an enemy to get the reporter to attack the creature with their weapon. Players can also attack an enemy directly by ramming it with their bodies, although this has limited effectiveness.

The purpose of the game is to film interesting footage by pointing the camera at objects and events of interest, such as documents, monster attacks, and live locational reports given by the reporter.

Players can earn three types of points in the game; "Suspense", "Erotic", or "Immoral". These points are determined by the player's camerawork and what events or objects they choose to focus on. "Suspense" points are the most standard, earned for good camerawork and the recording of interesting events. "Erotic" points are earned for filming up the reporter's skirt, and videoing pornographic magazines lying around the game's levels. "Immoral" points are earned for filming negative events, such as people being attacked by monsters, instead of trying to stop them. The type of points the player focuses on determines which of the three endings they receive (the identity of the player's character, the cameraman, differs in each ending).

The game is notable for multiple action events where the player can determine the fate of various secondary characters. Most prominently, the player's action or inaction can cause the reporter to be killed in a mission, in which case the reporter is replaced by a new character, and the player automatically skips ahead to the next level. Other than the character's death, and the inability to play the rest of the level, players are not penalized for allowing their reporters to die, and can even quickly skip to the game's ending by allowing each of their reporters to die as soon as possible.

Although the word Michigan by itself usually refers to the State of Michigan and Hell suggests the town of Hell, the game takes place in Chicago, Illinois, and is named because the game's phenomena center around Lake Michigan.

Reception

Michigan: Report from Hell received "mixed" reviews according to the review aggregation website Metacritic, though it is currently no longer on the website. The game sold 31,667 copies in Japan by December 20, 2004. Famitsu gave it a score of 30 out of 40.

Revealed in a March 15, 2008 interview with NGamer, Suda was previously unaware of the game's release in Europe.

Notes

References

External links
 

2004 video games
505 Games games
Grasshopper Manufacture games
2000s horror video games
PlayStation 2 games
PlayStation 2-only games
Single-player video games
Survival video games
Video games developed in Japan
Video games scored by Masafumi Takada
Video games set in Chicago